Cornholme is a village within the Metropolitan Borough of Calderdale, in West Yorkshire, England. The village is close to the A646 Burnley Road.

Cornholme was historically a part of Lancashire, and falls within the OL postcode area. The former principal industries of most of the Upper Calder Valley being cotton weaving and the manufacture of textile accessories such as shuttles and bobbins. The village became part of the West Riding of Yorkshire on 1 January 1888 and part of the Borough of Todmorden, within the West Riding, on 2 June 1896.

The Gem was once a cinema. There are no cinemas in Cornholme today.

Cornholme was until 1938 served by Cornholme railway station.

Cornholme is the location of a number of scenes in the 2004 film My Summer of Love.

Famous residents
Thomas Southwell (zoologist) FRSE FZS (1879-1962) parasitologist

References

External links

 Todmorden History including picture archives of the Cornholme area and the school

Villages in West Yorkshire
Geography of Calderdale
Todmorden